Marcelo José Bordon (born 7 January 1976) is a Brazilian former professional footballer who played as a centre-back. He is mostly known for his time in Germany, playing for Bundesliga teams VfB Stuttgart and Schalke 04. Since 2016, he is managing Rio Branco-SP.

Career
Bordon was born in Ribeirão Preto. He played for Bundesliga side FC Schalke 04 between 2004 and July 2010. He joined the club for a €2.6 million transfer fee from VfB Stuttgart. At Schalke 04, he formed a formidable central defence alongside Mladen Krstajić, boasting a formidable aerial ability and a capacity for leadership that earned him the role as team captain from the 2006–07 season until the summer of 2010. Although not a regular for the Brazil national team, he was part of the team that won the 2004 Copa América.

On 5 July 2010, Bordon's contract with Schalke was canceled and he signed a one-year contract with Al-Rayyan Sports Club three days later on 8 July 2010, earning approximately €6.5 million per year.

Honours
VfB Stuttgart
UEFA Intertoto Cup: 2000, 2002

Schalke 04
UEFA Intertoto Cup: 2004
DFL-Ligapokal: 2005

Brazil
2004 Copa América

References

External links
 

Living people
1976 births
Brazilian footballers
Brazilian football managers
Brazilian expatriate footballers
Brazilian people of Spanish descent
People from Ribeirão Preto
Bundesliga players
Expatriate footballers in Germany
Copa América-winning players
Brazil international footballers
2004 Copa América players
Brazilian expatriate sportspeople in Qatar
São Paulo FC players
Brazilian expatriate sportspeople in Germany
VfB Stuttgart players
Qatar Stars League players
Expatriate footballers in Qatar
FC Schalke 04 players
Rio Branco Esporte Clube managers
Association football defenders
Footballers from São Paulo (state)